"Rut" is a song by American rock band the Killers from their fifth studio album, Wonderful Wonderful (2017). It was serviced to UK hot adult contemporary radio on December 9, 2017, as the album's third and final single. The accompanying music video, directed by Danny Drysdale, was released on January 9, 2018, and depicts a woman who suffers from loneliness and depression at several points in her life, from childhood to adulthood. The single peaked at number 10 on the New Zealand Heatseeker Singles chart.

Composition
In an episode of the Song Exploder podcast on October 6, 2017, Brandon Flowers explained that the lyrics of "Rut" were inspired by his wife, Tana Mundkowsky, who struggles with posttraumatic stress disorder (PTSD) due to a traumatizing childhood. "The song is from my wife's point of view, and it's from her perspective. And it's about resilience. So, she's singing to me. It's almost like this submission, it's her accepting like, 'I'm facing this thing'", Flowers said. The pitch on Flowers' vocals was altered to make his voice sound more feminine.

Credits and personnel
Credits adapted from the liner notes of Wonderful Wonderful.

Recording locations
 Recorded at 11th Street Records (Las Vegas, Nevada), The Garage (Topanga, California), and Battle Born Studios (Las Vegas, Nevada)
 Mixed at Assault & Battery Studio 1 (London)
 Mastered at Metropolis (London)

Personnel
The Killers
 Brandon Flowers – vocals, keys
 Dave Keuning – guitar
 Mark Stoermer – fretless bass
 Ronnie Vannucci Jr. – drums

Additional personnel

 Jacknife Lee – production, engineering, guitar, keys, programming
 Matt Bishop – engineering
 Robert Root – engineering
 Malcolm Harrison – engineering assistance
 Alan Moulder – mixing
 Caesar Edmunds – mix engineering
 Becca Marie – additional vocals
 Las Vegas Mass Choir – additional vocals
 Nina Fechner – additional vocals
 Justin Diaz – additional vocals
 John Davis – mastering

Charts

References

External links

2010s ballads
2017 singles
2017 songs
Island Records singles
The Killers songs
Song recordings produced by Jacknife Lee
Songs written by Brandon Flowers
Songs written by Dave Keuning
Songs written by Jacknife Lee
Songs written by Mark Stoermer
Songs written by Ronnie Vannucci Jr.